Huaiheceras is a genus of ellesmerocerd from China, and type for the Heuhiceratidae that lived during the Late Cambrian. The shell is small, tubular, gently expanding and with a slight curvature. The siphuncle, which is proportionally narrow, is on the outer, concave curvature of the shell, suggesting it is exogastric. Septa are close spaced.

The genus Huaihecerina is similar but has a slightly greater curvature and greater rate of expansion.

References

 Chen Jun-yuan & Curt Teichert, 1983. Cambrian Cephalopods. Geology V.11, pp 647–650, Nov. 1983
 The Mollusca vol. 12, Paleontology and Neontology of Cephalopods  M.R. Clarke & E.R Trueman eds, Academic Press.

Prehistoric nautiloid genera
Ellesmerocerida